Bloomingburg may refer to:
 Bloomingburg, Ohio
 Bloomingburg, New York